Intelligent Resilient Framework (IRF) is a proprietary software virtualization technology developed by H3C (3Com). Its purpose is to connect multiple network devices through physical IRF ports and perform necessary configurations, then virtualize the devices into a distributed device. This virtualization technology performs the unified management and maintenance of multiple devices. This technology follows some of the same general concepts as Cisco's VSS and vPC technologies.

History
This technology was originally developed by 3Com and released in 2003 as XRN (eXpandable Resilient Networking).  When HP purchased 3Com in April 2010, HP renamed the technology to IRF.

General overview
Simplified topology and streamlined management. An IRF virtual device appears as a node on the network. You can log into it by connecting to any port of any member to manage all members of the IRF virtual device.
 Simple network operation. Various control protocols running on different member devices as if they are running on one device. For example, routing protocols calculate the routes of the IRF virtual device instead of calculating the routes of each member. This avoids a great number of protocol packet exchanges among the members, simplifies network operation, and shortens the convergence time during network flapping. In addition, this advantage of the IRF technology is not delivered by the common cluster technology, which only realizes the unified management of devices, and the devices in a cluster operate as independent nodes.
 Low cost. The IRF technology creates an IRF virtual device from multiple low-end devices, and thus the IRF virtual device has a higher port density and bandwidth and costs lower than using high-end devices.
 Powerful network expansion capability. By adding member devices, the number of IRF ports, network bandwidth, and processing capability of the IRF virtual device can be easily expanded.
 Protecting investment. Users only need to add new devices rather than replacing the original ones when upgrading a network because of the powerful network expansion capability of the IRF virtual device.
 High reliability. IRF provides both link and node redundancy. An IRF virtual device comprises multiple member devices that operate in 1:N redundancy: the master runs, manages and maintains the IRF virtual device, whereas the slaves process services as well as functioning as the backups. As soon as the master fails, the IRF virtual device immediately elects a new master to prevent service interruption. In addition, you can aggregate both IRF links of members and the links between the IRF virtual device and its upper or lower layer devices.
 High resiliency. You can increase the bandwidth and processing capability of an IRF virtual device simply by adding member devices. Each member device has its own CPU and they independently process and forward protocol packets.
 Diversified functions. IRF provides all features supported by a switch, such as IPv4, IPv6, MPLS, security features, OAA cards, high availability, which can run effectively and stably on the IRF virtual device, and thus expands the application of IRF virtual devices.
 Comprehensive product support. An IRF virtual device can be created from box-type devices or chassis-type distributed devices.
 Only devices of the same series can form an IRF.

Companies currently using this technology
The only companies that use this technology are Hewlett Packard Enterprise (HPE, formerly Hewlett-Packard) and H3C (also HPE, formerly 3Com).

Devices which support IRF
 HPE FlexNetwork HSR6800 Router Series
 HPE FlexFabric 5700 Switch Series
 HPE 5900 Switch Series
 HPE 5920 Switch Series
 HPE 5940 Switch Series
 HPE 6125XLG Ethernet Blade Switch
 HPE FlexFabric 12900E Switch Series

See also
 IEEE 802.1aq (Shortest Path Bridging)
 H3C
 HPE
 Huawei
 Link aggregation
 TRILL (TRansparent Interconnection of Lots of Links)

References

Ethernet
Link protocols